This is a list of lighthouses in Georgia.

Lighthouses

See also
 Lists of lighthouses and lightvessels

References

External links

 
  State Hydrographic Service of Georgia

Georgia
Lighthouses
Lighthouses